Antonio Tiberi (born 24 June 2001) is an Italian road cyclist, who currently rides for UCI WorldTeam .

Career
He won the men's junior time trial at the 2019 UCI Road World Championships, overcoming a crank failure before the first corner of the course which forced him to change bikes.

It was published on 28 February 2023 that Tiberi was fined €4,000 for killing a cat allegedly owned by San Marino's Minister of Tourism Federico Pedini Amati with an air rifle. The incident occurred in June 2022. Later that day his team  announced that Tiberi would be suspended for the next 20 days without pay, forcing him to miss out on multiple races he was supposed to participate in.

Major results

2018
 2nd Time trial, National Junior Road Championships
 2nd Trofeo Citta di Loano
 3rd  Time trial, UEC European Junior Road Championships
 6th Overall Course de la Paix Juniors
1st  Young rider classification
 9th Road race, UCI Junior Road World Championships
 9th Trofeo Buffoni
 9th Gran Premio dell'Arno
2019
 1st  Time trial, UCI Junior Road World Championships
 1st Trofeo Guido Dorigo
 1st  Mountains classification Giro della Lunigiana
 3rd Time trial, National Junior Road Championships
 6th Time trial, UEC European Junior Road Championships
 7th Overall Course de la Paix Juniors
1st Stages 2a (ITT) & 3
 8th Gent–Wevelgem Juniors
 9th Trofeo Buffoni
2020 
 1st Trofeo Città di San Vendemiano
 3rd Time trial, National Under-23 Road Championships
2021
 3rd Overall Tour de Hongrie
2022
 1st Stage 5 Tour de Hongrie
 5th Overall Settimana Internazionale di Coppi e Bartali
 8th GP Industria & Artigianato
2023
 7th Overall UAE Tour
 8th Overall Tour Down Under

Grand Tour general classification results timeline

References

External links

2001 births
Living people
Italian male cyclists
People from Frosinone
Cyclists from Lazio
Sportspeople from the Province of Frosinone